Greenhithe is a northwestern suburb of Auckland, New Zealand, located on the North Shore.

Greenhithe was so named after a village on the River Thames, in Kent, named by Henry James Blyth, who settled there in 1882 and came from the original Greenhithe in England. Greenhithe comes from the Old English word 'hithe' or 'hythe', meaning wharf. The name is appropriate, since Greenhithe has a wharf onto Lucas Creek that leads into the estuaries of Auckland's Waitematā Harbour. 

In 2001 Greenhithe had a population of 4,170 according to the census. It showed dramatic growth after the North Shore City Council determined that it was to be a major growth area. Where once the typical section size was a quarter to half an acre, the newer subdivisions of Wainoni, Admiral's Court and others have reduced that to around 600m2 (with a quarter acre being a shade over 1000m2). Since 1 November 2010, Greenhithe has been under the governance of Auckland Council.

Greenhithe includes the Wainoni area around Wainoni Park.

Historically, Greenhithe extended from the Upper Harbour Bridge through to Wainoni Park in the north. New subdivisions have extended the urban boundaries through to "Greenhithe North", including the northern part of Kyle Rd and Schnapper Rock. Until a proposed bridge is built to join the two Kyle Rds, these areas may have more community affiliation with Albany.

Greenhithe is bordered by Lucas Creek in the north and Hellyers Creek in the south. New Zealand Transport Agency completed the Upper Harbour Motorway through Greenhithe, in late 2007.

Demographics

Greenhithe had a population of 8,592 at the 2018 New Zealand census, an increase of 909 people (11.8%) since the 2013 census, and an increase of 2,691 people (45.6%) since the 2006 census. There were 2,613 households, comprising 4,263 males and 4,329 females, giving a sex ratio of 0.98 males per female, with 1,821 people (21.2%) aged under 15 years, 1,758 (20.5%) aged 15 to 29, 4,245 (49.4%) aged 30 to 64, and 768 (8.9%) aged 65 or older.

Ethnicities were 71.1% European/Pākehā, 4.6% Māori, 2.0% Pacific peoples, 26.1% Asian, and 3.1% other ethnicities. People may identify with more than one ethnicity.

The percentage of people born overseas was 41.4, compared with 27.1% nationally.

Although some people chose not to answer the census's question about religious affiliation, 58.3% had no religion, 31.1% were Christian, 0.1% had Māori religious beliefs, 1.8% were Hindu, 0.9% were Muslim, 0.9% were Buddhist and 1.5% had other religions.

Of those at least 15 years old, 2,334 (34.5%) people had a bachelor's or higher degree, and 543 (8.0%) people had no formal qualifications. 2,022 people (29.9%) earned over $70,000 compared to 17.2% nationally. The employment status of those at least 15 was that 3,699 (54.6%) people were employed full-time, 1,062 (15.7%) were part-time, and 192 (2.8%) were unemployed.

Education

The school opened as a small rural school in 1893.

The school opened in February 2006.

References

External links
 Greenhithe Residents Association
 Greenhithe School
 Photographs of Greenhithe held in Auckland Libraries' heritage collections.

Suburbs of Auckland
North Shore, New Zealand
Populated places around the Waitematā Harbour